The Black and White Album is the fourth studio album by Swedish rock band The Hives. The track listing for The Black and White Album was confirmed on the band's German website on 13 September 2007, and later through NME. The Hives recorded 20 to 30 songs (including seven recorded with producers The Neptunes) for this album from which they finally chose the best. Other tracks were produced by Jacknife Lee and Dennis Herring. Sessions were held with Timbaland, with whom the band produced the song "Throw It On Me", but took place too late for any of the resulting tracks to be on the album. They hoped to use these songs as B-sides.

Background
The band revealed in an NME interview that one song, "Puppet on a String", has just "piano and hand claps".

The song "A Stroll Through Hive Manor Corridors" is an instrumental using just a 1960s organ and a drum machine.

The song "Fall Is Just Something Grownups Invented" was used for autumn promotions on the US television channel Cartoon Network in 2007. This song appears as a bonus track on the United Kingdom version of the album, the iTunes release in the United States and in the Japanese Edition with the album, along with "Hell No".

"Well All Right!" and "T.H.E.H.I.V.E.S." were produced by The Neptunes.

"Try It Again" features the cheerleading squad from the University of Mississippi.  It was also featured in a commercial for the film Get Him to the Greek.  "Try It Again" was used in an opening scene in the Chuck episode Chuck vs. The Third Dimension. "Try It Again" was part of the promotional trailers for the USA show White Collar. In 2013, it was featured in the movies The Internship and R.I.P.D..

The song "Tick Tick Boom" was the official theme song for WWE's Survivor Series 2007 and also featured in the Madden NFL 11 soundtrack. "Tick Tick Boom" featured on a teaser trailer for the 2008 film Get Smart and was also used in a video for the 81st Oscars Awards. In 2010 the 12 contestants in American Idol made a Ford video including this song. And also a playable song for LEGO Rock Band and Guitar Hero: Warriors of Rock

"Well, All Right" has been featured on Sears' spring and summer commercials and a playable track of NBA Live 08, as well as part of the official trailer of The Pink Panther 2.

A video for "Won't Be Long" was released on The Hives MySpace on 26 August 2008.

"Hey Little World" is featured in trailers for the film Kick-Ass and in Victoria's Secret commercials.

Release
The first single from the album "Tick Tick Boom" appeared in the games Madden NFL 08 and Madden NFL 11; although it is an early version with some notable changes, such as an alternative chorus. The final version appears on the album as well as in NCAA Football 10. Clips from this song appeared in a Nike commercial (2007-08-14th US, and 2007-09-24th UK) prior to the single's release date on 8 October 2007.

On 9 October 2007 iTunes Globally released the singles: "Tick Tick Boom", "Try It Again", "You Got It All... Wrong", "Well All Right!", "Won't Be Long", and the non-album bonus track "Fall Is Just Something Grownups Invented".

The originally scheduled release of the album (on 9 October 2007) was postponed until 15 October 2007 in the United Kingdom (via Polydor Records) and 13 November 2007 in the United States (via A&M/Octone Records and No Fun AB).

On 17 December 2007 the band's website confirmed "T.H.E.H.I.V.E.S." would be released in February 2008 as a single.

Track listing
All songs by Randy Fitzsimmons

Personnel
Howlin' Pelle Almqvist – vocals, piano
Nicholaus Arson – lead guitar, backing vocals
Vigilante Carlstroem – rhythm guitar, organ/backing vocals
Dr. Matt Destruction – bass guitar, backing vocals on "Tick Tick Boom"
Chris Dangerous – drums, backing vocals on "Tick Tick Boom"
Pelle Gunnerfeldt – mixing
Serban Ghenea – mixing
Joe Zook – mixing
Ted Jensen – mastering
Dennis Herring – producer
The Neptunes – producers
Garret "Jacknife" Lee – producer
Thomas Öberg – producer
Matt Radosevich – engineer

Charts

References

2007 albums
The Hives albums
Albums produced by Jacknife Lee
Albums produced by Dennis Herring
Albums produced by the Neptunes